Newington Rangers Football Club is a Northern Irish junior-level Football Club. After leaving Division 2A other Northern Amateur Football League (NAFL) in 2019, they are now playing in the Ballymena and Provincial Football League Junior Division 2. Its home ground is Sandy Bay in  Larne, County Antrim. The club joined the Amateur League in 1990. The team is currently managed by Andy Hall

The club previously held intermediate status and played in the Irish Cup. However they were relegated back to junior level in 2016 after finishing bottom of Division 1C of the NAFL.

The reserve team play in Division 3 of the Ballymena and Provincial Football League and is managed by Richard Girvin.

Club officials
Chairman of the Board: Stephen McClean
1st Team Manager: Andy Hall
2nd Team Manager: Richard Girvin

Honours

Intermediate honours
 McElroy Cup: 1
 1930–31

External links
 Newington Rangers Official Facebook page
 Newington Rangers Official Club website
 nifootball.co.uk - (For fixtures, results and tables of all Northern Ireland amateur football leagues)

References

Association football clubs in Northern Ireland
Association football clubs in County Antrim
Northern Amateur Football League clubs
1920 establishments in Ireland
Association football clubs established in 1920